The Corner is a 2000 HBO drama television miniseries based on the nonfiction book The Corner: A Year in the Life of an Inner-City Neighborhood (1997) by David Simon and Ed Burns, and adapted for television by David Simon and David Mills. It premiered on HBO in the United States on April 16, 2000 and concluded its six-part run on May 21, 2000. The series was released on DVD on July 22, 2003. It won the Primetime Emmy Award for Outstanding Miniseries in 2000.

The Corner chronicles the life of a family living in poverty amid the open-air drug markets of West Baltimore. "The corner" is the junction of West Fayette Street and North Monroe Street (U.S. Route 1).

Cast and characters   
 T. K. Carter as Gary McCullough, a drug addict; DeAndre's father, and Fran's ex-husband. He dropped out of college when Fran became pregnant and became addicted to drugs after their marriage ended.
 Khandi Alexander as Francine "Fran" Boyd, a drug addict; DeAndre McCullough and DeRodd Hearns' mother, and Gary's ex-wife. She lives in the "Dew Drop Inn" with her sisters, Bunchie and Sharry, brother Stevie, and his son.
 Sean Nelson as DeAndre "Black" McCullough, a 15-year-old drug dealer; Gary McCullough and Francine "Fran" Boyd's son.
 Clarke Peters as Fat Curt
 Glenn Plummer as George "Blue" Epps
 Toy Connor as Tyreeka Freamon
 Maria Broom as Bunchie Boyd
 Sylvester Lee Kirk as DeRodd, DeAndre's younger brother
 Corey Parker Robinson as R.C.
 Reg E. Cathey as Scalio
 Rodney Scott as Little DeAndre

Many actors from The Corner  had also appeared in Homicide: Life on the Street (1993–1999), which was adapted from Simon's book, Homicide: A Year on the Killing Streets (1991). Similarly, many actors who appeared in The Corner later appeared in Simon's next television series, The Wire (2002–2008), often playing contrasting characters, e.g., Clarke Peters, Maria Broom, Corey Parker Robinson, Reg E. Cathey, Clayton LeBouef, Donnell Rawlings, Tootsie Duvall, Robert F. Chew, Lance Reddick, Delaney Williams, and DeAndre McCullough (as an assistant to Brother Mouzone). Additionally, Alexander and Peters later starred in Simon's television series Treme (2010–2013), and DeAndre McCullough (who also played a bit role in The Corner, as a policeman who arrested 15-year-old DeAndre) briefly worked for the show in set construction and on the security crew.

Episodes   
Each episode starts and ends with a documentary style interview, wherein a lead character answers questions posed by the director, Charles S. Dutton.

Reception

Critical response 
The review aggregator website Rotten Tomatoes reported a 100% approval rating with an average rating of 10/10, based on 14 critic reviews. The website's critics consensus reads, "Powerfully performed and authentically written, The Corner is an unwavering depiction of life under the thumb of addiction and poverty." Metacritic, which uses a weighted average, assigned a score of 90 out of 100 based on 21 critics, indicating "universal acclaim".

A review by Hugh K. David of DVD Times praised The Corner as "raw, gritty, uncompromising, realistic, smartly directed, supremely well-acted, compulsively watchable, but harrowing and with little light at the end of the tunnel", comparing it to the television equivalent of such films as Last Exit to Brooklyn (1989) and Requiem for a Dream (2000; also adapted from novels), with elements in common with both La Haine (1995) and City of God (2002).

Awards 
The miniseries received three Emmy awards at the 52nd Primetime Emmy Awards. It won for Primetime Emmy Award for Outstanding Miniseries; Primetime Emmy Award for Outstanding Directing for a Miniseries, Movie or a Special (Charles S. Dutton) and Outstanding Writing for a Miniseries or a Movie (David Simon and David Mills); and was nominated for Outstanding Casting for a Miniseries, Movie or a Special. It also won a Peabody Award in 2000.

Related media
  "Fifteen years after David Simon and Ed Burns spent a year chronicling an inner city neighborhood in Baltimore in the book and HBO miniseries "The Corner," Need to Know returns to see how life has changed for one of the main characters they profiled."
 "Scott Simon returns to the inner city community in Baltimore that he first visited last fall to see if recent improvements in the economy are improving the lot of chronically under-employed and unemployed young African-American men there."

References

Further reading
 Boo was fatally shot by a 16-year-old female hanger-on with the Vincent Street crew. Dinky was fatally shot by the Terrace boys, at age 17; he is buried at Mount Zion, in Baltimore.

External links 
 
 

2000 American television series debuts
2000 American television series endings
2000s American television miniseries
HBO original programming
Television shows based on books
Television shows set in Baltimore
Television series based on actual events
U.S. Route 1
Television episodes written by David Simon
Peabody Award-winning television programs
Primetime Emmy Award for Outstanding Miniseries winners
Primetime Emmy Award-winning television series
Films directed by Charles S. Dutton